Alicja Bachleda-Curuś (pron. ; born 12 May 1983) is a Mexican-born Polish actress and singer, who has appeared in films including Trade, Ondine and Pan Tadeusz.

Early life 
Bachleda-Curuś was born in Tampico, Mexico. She is the daughter of Lidia and Tadeusz Bachleda-Curuś, a geologist who was working in Mexico at that time. Her uncle, Adam Bachleda-Curuś, is the former mayor of Zakopane, Poland.

While growing up in Poland, Bachleda studied at the Elzbieta Armatys' Theater, Music and Dance Studio. She studied acting at the Lee Strasberg Theatre and Film Institute in New York City.

Acting career 

At age 15, Bachleda landed a lead role in the 1999 film Pan Tadeusz, directed by Academy Award-winning Polish director Andrzej Wajda. Four years later, she won a role in Polish soap opera Na dobre i na złe. Bachleda then began crossing over into mainstream films outside Poland, appearing in the German film Sommersturm, a coming of age story, in 2004. Bachleda-Curuś returned to Mexico to film the 2007 thriller Trade, starring Kevin Kline, an unflinching look at the world of human trafficking. Bachleda then returned to Europe to play a Jewish girl in the historical drama Der geköpfte Hahn, which took place during World War II in Transylvania, Romania. Her next film was 2009's Ondine, a film about an Irish fisherman who thinks he catches a selkie, a mythological seal/human.

In 2012 Bachleda-Curuś starred as Eleanor of Austria, Queen of Poland in September Eleven 1683, and appeared in a lead role in The Girl Is in Trouble.

Personal life 
On 7 October 2009 in Los Angeles, Bachleda-Curuś gave birth to Henry Tadeusz Farrell, her son with Irish actor Colin Farrell. Henry was baptized on 29 December 2009 in the Roman Catholic Church of the Visitation of the Blessed Virgin Mary in Kraków. It was reported on 15 October 2010 that Farrell and Bachleda-Curuś had separated.

Filmography

Film

Television series

Video games

Discography

Albums 
 Klimat (2001)

Singles 
 "Dotknąć nieba" (with Piotr Cugowski (son of Krzysztof Cugowski)) (2007)
 "Klimat" (2001)
 "Ich verlier mich gern in Dir" (from the film Heart Over Head) (2001)
 "Marzyć chcę" (1999)

References

External links 

 
 Alicja in New York Times May 2007
 Alicja in GQ Magazine July 2007
 Interview with Alicja Bachleda Presented by Linda O'Brien

1983 births
Living people
People from Tampico, Tamaulipas
Mexican film actresses
Polish film actresses
Mexican Roman Catholics
Polish Roman Catholics
21st-century Polish actresses
Mexican people of Polish descent
Polish women singers
Polish pop singers
Singers from Tamaulipas
21st-century Mexican singers
21st-century Polish singers
21st-century Mexican women singers